Alicia Pillay (born 24 March 1980) is a South African former professional tennis player.

Career
Born Pietermaritzburg, Pillay completed her schooling in the United States, attending Boca Preparatory School while she trained at the Evert Tennis Academy. She then played varsity tennis, first at Oklahoma Christian University, before transferring to the University of Tulsa.

Pillay, a right-handed player, represented South Africa at the 1999 All-Africa Games and won a gold medal in the team event. In both 2005 and 2006 she played for the South Africa Fed Cup team, featuring in a total of seven ties. Her Fed Cup career included singles matches against Caroline Wozniacki and Ana Ivanovic.

ITF finals

Singles: 3 (2–1)

Doubles: 6 (1–5)

See also
List of South Africa Fed Cup team representatives

References

External links
 
 
 

1980 births
Living people
South African female tennis players
African Games gold medalists for South Africa
African Games medalists in tennis
Competitors at the 1999 All-Africa Games
Oklahoma Christian Eagles and Lady Eagles athletes
Tulsa Golden Hurricane women's tennis players
Sportspeople from Pietermaritzburg
21st-century South African women